This is a list of years in Jordan.

16th century

17th century

18th century

19th century

20th century

21st century

See also
 Timeline of the Hashemite Kingdom of Jordan
 Timeline of Amman

External links
 

 
Jordan-related lists
Jordan
years